Wealth is the total sum value of monetary assets and valuable material possessions owned by an individual, minus private debt, at a set point in time.

There is a difference between median and mean wealth. Median wealth is the amount that divides the wealth distribution into two equal groups: half the adults have wealth above the median, and the other half below. Mean wealth is the amount obtained by dividing the total aggregate wealth by the number of adults. In nations where wealth is highly concentrated in a small percentage of people, the mean can be much higher than the median.

A Global Wealth Report is published annually by Credit Suisse. This article shows the distribution of wealth in Europe.

2021

* indicates "Income in COUNTRY" or "Economy of COUNTRY" links.

For several European countries, Credit Suisse could only provide rough estimates of mean wealth, with no information about the distribution of said wealth, citing poor data quality.

* indicates "Income in COUNTRY or TERRITORY" or "Economy of COUNTRY or TERRITORY" links.

See also
Distribution of wealth by country
Financial and social rankings of sovereign states in Europe
High-net-worth individual
List of countries by financial assets per capita
List of countries by GDP (PPP) per capita
List of countries by GNI (nominal) per capita
List of countries by income equality
List of countries by total wealth
List of countries by wealth per adult
Ultra high-net-worth individual
Wealth inequality in the United States
Wealth

References

External links
 Wealth - OECD Statistics - OECD.org.

Lists of countries by per capita values
European Union member economies